Christopher Mark Houlihan (born October 6, 1987) is an American concert organist noted for his clarity, flexibility of rhythm, and technical achievement. His Vierne 2012 tour in which he performed Louis Vierne's complete organ symphonies in six cities across North America was met with high critical acclaim.

Biography 
Originally from Somers, Connecticut, Houlihan began studying the organ at the age of 12 with John Rose, and at the age of 15, he won first prize in the Albert Schweitzer National Organ Competition. Houlihan attended Trinity College in Hartford where he continued to study with John Rose and made his orchestral debut with the Hartford Symphony. After graduating from Trinity College, he attended the Juilliard School in New York where he studied with the Grammy Award winning organist Paul Jacobs.

In 2005-2006, Houlihan was organ scholar at the Cathedral of St. Joseph in Hartford and then at Christ Church Cathedral in Hartford from 2006-2007. Houlihan later studied at the French National Regional Conservatory in Versailles where he was a student of Jean-Baptiste Robin and where he earned the “Prix de Perfectionnement” (equivalent to a university artist’s diploma in the US). While in France, he served as an assistant musician at the American Cathedral in Paris and had the honor of performing for the then President and First Lady of the United States, Mr. and Mrs. George W. Bush.

His first CD, Louis Vierne: Second Symphony for Organ was released by Towerhill Recordings in 2007, and featured music of Charles-Marie Widor and Louis Vierne. Houlihan was praised for his "elegant playing"and named "a major talent." His second CD, Joys, Mournings, and Battles: Music of Duruflé and Alain, recorded on the historic Aeolian-Skinner organ in All Saints Church, Worcester, MA, was released in January 2010. Houlihan was praised for his “passion and great technical facility” by audiophile.

In 2012 Houlihan launched his “Vierne 2012” tour commemorating the 75th anniversary of the French composer’s death. Houlihan played the complete organ symphonies of Louis Vierne in six North American cities (New York, Denver, Chicago, Los Angeles, Montreal, and Dallas). His tour launch concert in New York City at the Church of the Ascension is “considered as one of New York’s all-time great organ recitals.” Mark Swed of the Los Angeles Times described the tour as a "major revelation" and credited it with “launching a major career.”

Houlihan has been a featured performer at four conventions of the American Guild of Organists. He has performed professionally in 29 states as well as in Canada, France and Scotland.

Approach and style 

Houlihan is noted for his flexibility, clarity, technical achievement, and clear cut American sense of rhythm.  As an artist, he has placed an importance on “taking the organ, and organ music, out of the corner it's in as a second-class citizen in the classical music world.”

Recordings 

2007: Louis Vierne: Second Symphony for Organ
2010: Joys, Mournings, and Battles: Music of Duruflé and Alain
2017: Christopher Houlihan Plays Bach
2023: Franck & Vierne: First and Last

Awards

References

External links
 Official Website
 Phillip Truckenbrod Concert Artists
 Vierne 2012

Living people
American classical organists
American male organists
1987 births
Musicians from Connecticut
Trinity College (Connecticut) alumni
People from Somers, Connecticut
21st-century American keyboardists
21st-century organists
21st-century American male musicians
Male classical organists